Sir John William Fisher (30 January 1788 – 22 March 1876) was a British surgeon.

Life

Fisher, son of Peter Fisher of Perth, by Mary, daughter of James Kennay of York, was born in London 30 January 1788, and apprenticed to John Andrews, a surgeon enjoying a large practice. After studying at St. George's and Westminster Hospitals, he was admitted member of the Royal College of Surgeons in 1809, became a fellow in 1836, and was a member of the council in 1843. The University of Erlangen conferred on him the degree of M.D. in 1841.

He was appointed surgeon to the Bow Street patrol in 1821 by Lord Sidmouth, and promoted to the post of surgeon-in-chief to the Metropolitan Police Force at the time of its formation in 1829, which position he held until his retirement on a pension in 1865.

He was knighted by Queen Victoria at Osborne on 2 September 1858. He died at 33 Park Lane, London, 22 March 1876, and was buried in Kensal Green Cemetery on 29 March, when six of his oldest medical friends were the pallbearers. His will was proved on 22 April, the personalty being sworn under £50,000.

He was buried at Kensal Green Cemetery in London.

Family

He married, first, 18 April 1829, Louisa Catherine, eldest daughter of William Haymes of Kibworth Harcourt, Leicestershire, she died in London on 5 October 1860; and secondly, 18 June 1862, Lilias Stuart, second daughter of Colonel Alexander Mackenzie of Grinnard, Ross-shire.

References

Attribution

1788 births
1876 deaths
Alumni of St George's, University of London
British surgeons
Burials at Kensal Green Cemetery
Chief Surgeons of the Metropolitan Police